Kallikrein 13 (KLK13, kallikrein mK13, mGK-13, mK13, mKLK13, prorenin converting enzyme 1, PRECE-1, prorenin-converting enzyme, PRECE, proteinase P) is an enzyme. This enzyme catalyses the following chemical reaction

 Hydrolyses mouse Ren2 protein (a species of prorenin present in the submandibular gland) on the carboxy side of the arginine residue at the Lys-Arg- pair in the N-terminus, to yield mature renin

This enzyme belongs in peptidase family S1A.

References

External links 
 

EC 3.4.21